Paul D'Agostino (artist) can be found here. 

Paul D'Agostino (born July 13, 1956) is a former midfielder or defender who played professionally for several teams in the North American Soccer League (NASL).

He played in the National Soccer League (NSL) in 1972 with Toronto Italia. In 1981, he served as captain of the Calgary Boomers. After his stint with Calgary he returned to the NSL to play with Toronto Panhellenic.

External links
 NASL stats

References

1956 births
Living people
Italian footballers
Calgary Boomers players
Toronto Italia players
Toronto Blizzard (1971–1984) players
Memphis Rogues players
Italian emigrants to Canada
Expatriate soccer players in the United States
Expatriate soccer players in Canada
York University alumni
York Lions soccer players
Canadian National Soccer League players
North American Soccer League (1968–1984) players
North American Soccer League (1968–1984) indoor players
Association football defenders